Ed Moses may refer to:

 Ed Moses (artist) (1926–2018), American abstract artist
 Edwin Moses (born 1955), American 400 meter-hurdler
 Ed Moses (swimmer) (born 1980), American swimmer
 Ed Moses (physicist), American physicist